The 2005–06 New York Knicks season was the 60th season for the team in the National Basketball Association (NBA). The Knicks had the eighth pick in the 2005 NBA draft, and selected Channing Frye from the University of Arizona. During the off-season, the Knicks hired head coach Larry Brown, acquired Eddy Curry and Antonio Davis from the Chicago Bulls, and acquired Quentin Richardson and rookie guard Nate Robinson from the Phoenix Suns. At mid-season, they traded Penny Hardaway and second-year forward Trevor Ariza to the Orlando Magic in exchange for All-Star guard Steve Francis, and dealt Davis back to his former team, the Toronto Raptors, in exchange for Jalen Rose.

The Knicks finished with a 23–59 record, which left them in last place in the Atlantic Division. They had the fewest wins in the Eastern Conference in the 2005–06 season, and only the Portland Trail Blazers had fewer wins in the NBA with a 21–61 record. The Knicks' payroll for the 2005-2006 season was $124 million, putting them $74.5 million above the salary cap, and $62.3 million above the luxury tax line.

Frye averaged 12.3 points per game, and was named to the NBA All-Rookie First Team, and Robinson won the Slam Dunk Contest during the All-Star Weekend in Houston. Following the season, Brown was fired after spending only one season with the team. Isiah Thomas, the Knicks' general manager, was named head coach for the 2006–07 season.

NBA draft

Roster

Regular season

Record vs. opponents

See also
2005–06 NBA season

References

New York Knicks seasons
New York Knicks
New York Knicks
New York Knick
2000s in Manhattan
Madison Square Garden